A motor coach (international usage) or motorcar (US usage) is a self-propelled passenger vehicle also capable of hauling a train. With multiple unit train control, one operator can control several "motor coaches", possibly even combined with locomotives, efficiently in the same train, making longer trains possible. 

Motor coaches can replace locomotives at the head of local passenger or freight trains. Especially electrified narrow gauge lines on the European continent often saw this form of operation. Many of these railways closed down, and many others changed to electric multiple units. However, a few lines in Switzerland, Italy and Austria still work with train consists hauled by motor coaches. It can be expected that the Bernina line of Rhaetian Railway will continue for a long time to be operated with motor coaches pulling passenger and freight trains.

Examples of motor coaches

Examples of railcars

Examples of multiple units not combined with other vehicles

See also

 Autorail
 Budd RDC
 Budd SPV-2000
 British Rail Class 108
 ČD Class 810
 ČD Class 814
 ČD Class 840 and 841
 New York City Subway rolling stock
Power car
 Railbus
 Railcar
 Railmotor
 Uerdingen railbus

Categories
 Railcar
 Railbus
 Multiple Unit
 Locomotive

General
 Autorail
 British Rail Railbuses

References

Literature 
 
 

Railbuses
Multiple units